Michael "Boxer" Slattery is a hurler from County Kerry in Ireland. He has played with Ballyheigue and the Kerry senior team.

Club career

Slattery has won 3 County Senior Championships with Ballyheigue in 1996,1997 and 2000 when he was captain. He has also won a number of North Kerry League and Championship medals with Ballyheigue. He also won four u-21 championships and a county minor medal with his club.

Intercounty career

Slattery was a member of the Kerry Senior team for a number of years and was captain of the team that won the NHL Div 2 title in 2001 when Kerry beat Westmeath on a score line of 4-14 to 3-10 at Croke Park Slattery scoring 1-10 of his sides total. In 2003 he was Kerrys top scorer in the championship with 3-23 with put him 4th in Munster along with the likes of Joe Deane, Paul Flynn and Eoin Kelly. He was also on two losing league final teams in 2003 and 2006. He was a member of the Munster Railway Cup team in 1998.

Club

 County Senior Hurling Championship 3: 1996,1997,2000
 County Senior Hurling Championship Winning Captain:2000
 County Junior Hurling Championship 1: 2018
 County U21 Hurling Championship 4: 1994,1995,1996,1997
 County Minor Hurling Championship 1: 1992
 County Senior Hurling League (Div.1) 4: 1996, 2002, 2005, 2011
 North Kerry Senior Championship 3: 1995, 1996, 1999
 North Kerry Senior League 4:  1996, 2000, 2002, 2007

Intercounty

 National Hurling League (Div 2): 2001
 Kerry Senior Hurling Team Caption: 2001

References
http://www.sportsfile.com/id/069167/
http://www.sportsfile.com/id/023857/
http://www.sportsfile.com/id/059264/
http://www.kerrygaa.ie/old_website/old/cship00.htm#senhur
http://www.kerrygaa.ie/old_website/old/cship01.htm#senhur

Kerry inter-county hurlers
Ballyheigue hurlers
Munster inter-provincial hurlers
Living people
Year of birth missing (living people)